An itinerant preacher (also known as an itinerant minister or evangelist or circuit rider) is a Christian evangelist who preaches the basic Christian redemption message while traveling around to different groups of people within a relatively short period of time. The usage of these travelling ministers is known as itineracy or itinerancy.

History
Early 1st Century New Testament figures such as John the Baptist, Jesus Christ and Apostle Paul were known for extensively traveling and preaching to unreached people groups in the Middle East and Europe, although often staying for longer periods than modern itinerant evangelists.

Starting in the eighteenth century, the Methodists were known for sending out itinerant preachers known as circuit riders to share the message. The 'Itinerancy' is denoted as one of the "chief peculiar usages" of classic Methodism, along with practices such as class meetings and watchnight services.

Mary Porteous was a Primitive Methodist itinereant preacher. She was given permission to ignore the rules that applied to women itinerant preachers. She wrote about her time on the North Shields circuit in 1836. She travelled 682 miles and over 200 of these she had walked, begging for food and lodging and carrying her own luggage.

See also
Circuit rider (religious)
Mendicant

References

Christian clergy by type
Itinerant living
Evangelism